Andersen Tax LLC is a tax firm headquartered in San Francisco, California, United States. It provides tax, valuation, financial advisory and consulting services to individuals and corporate clients. It has offices in Chicago, Baltimore, Boston, Dallas, Florham Park, Greenwich, Harrisburg, Houston, Long Island, Los Angeles, New York City, Orange County, Philadelphia, San Francisco, Seattle, Silicon Valley, Washington, D.C., West Palm Beach and Woodland Hills.

With the establishment of Andersen Global in 2013 the firm has since added locations in Europe, Latin America, Africa and the Middle East.

History 
Andersen Tax was established as Wealth and Tax Advisory Services in July 2002. In the wake of Arthur Andersen's demise, several former partners of Arthur Andersen formed Wealth and Tax Advisory Services USA Inc. (WTAS), a subsidiary of HSBC USA, Inc, to handle a portion of Arthur Andersen's tax practice. The new HSBC Private Client Services Group would serve the wealth and tax advisory needs of high-net-worth individuals.

On December 31, 2007, HSBC USA Inc. sold Wealth & Tax Advisory Services USA Inc. (‘WTAS’) to participating WTAS managing directors in a management buyout (MBO) resulting in WTAS LLC. In consideration for the sale, HSBC would receive US $5 million in cash and deferred notes with a principal amount totaling US $60.85 million.

In July 2013, WTAS LLC established WTAS Global as an international association of independent professional services firms.

By November, WTAS Global had acquired the Paris-based law firm STC Partners.

On September 2, 2014, WTAS LLC changed its name to Andersen Tax LLC and WTAS Global changed its name to Andersen Global.

In June 2015 Andersen Global launched in Latin America with the addition of Mexican firms, NOVINT, Capin, Ibañez & Asociados and Montes, Hernández, López y Del Castillo. Mexico was followed shortly by an office in Guatemala through the addition of Trust Consulting in Guatemala City.

By the end of 2015 Andersen Global had added a new presence in Spain and Brazil. Andersen Global now has 45 international locations with over 1,200 professionals worldwide. Through fall of 2016, they added services in Guatemala and collaborations with mgpartners, a leading tax firm in Ireland

By the end of 2016, Andersen Global had a presence in 51 locations worldwide.

On March 1, 2017, Andersen Tax & Legal made its debut in Spain as the firm, formerly named Global Abogados, is the first in Europe to adopt the Andersen name. Since, Andersen Global has added member firms in Italy, Portugal, and Germany  all adopting the name Andersen Tax & Legal.

Through 2017, Andersen Tax debuts in Poland, Luxembourg, Switzerland, Israel, Canada, Turkey and Nigeria, initiates expansion in Egypt, Greece, Uruguay, Tanzania, Kenya, Ecuador and Cyprus through collaboration agreements and expands presence in Brazil to Rio de Janeiro.

Andersen Global closed out 2017 with a presence in 84 locations.

2018 has brought the debut of the Andersen name in Ireland, Egypt, France, Ecuador and Kenya along with notable expansion in Spain, Portugal, Mexico, UK, Luxembourg, Canada and Brazil. The international association has also added a presence in Argentina, Kuwait, Mozambique, Angola, Hungary, Jordan, India, Paraguay and Bolivia.

On April 23, 2019, Andersen Global expanded into its fiftieth country with the addition of a collaborating firm in Zambia.

On September 3, 2019, Andersen Tax rebranded to Andersen.

References

Financial services companies established in 2002
Consulting firms established in 2002
Companies based in San Francisco